José Alejandro Zelaya Villalobo is a Salvadoran politician. He serves as Minister of Finance in the cabinet of President Nayib Bukele. He previously served as Deputy Minister of Revenue in the same cabinet.

References 

Living people
Year of birth missing (living people)
Place of birth missing (living people)
Finance ministers of El Salvador
Nuevas Ideas politicians